Modern Woodmen of America (MWA) is one of the largest (based on assets) fraternal benefit societies in the United States, with more than 750,000 members. Total assets reached US$15.4 billion in 2016. Though it shares the same founder, it is not affiliated financially in any way with another, similarly-styled fraternal benefit society, WoodmenLife, and despite the name "Modern" is actually older than its counterpart.

History

Early years 

Modern Woodmen of America was founded by Joseph Cullen Root on January 5, 1883, in Lyons, Iowa. He had operated a number of businesses, including a mercantile establishment, a grain elevator and two flour mills, sold insurance and real estate, taught bookkeeping classes, managed a lecture bureau, and practiced law. Root was a member of several fraternal societies throughout the years. He wanted to create an organization that would protect families following the death of a breadwinner.

During a Sunday sermon, Root heard the pastor tell a parable about pioneer woodmen clearing away forests to build homes, communities and security for their families. He adopted the term "woodmen" for his organization. To complete the name, he added "modern" to reflect the need to stay current and change with the times, and "of America" to symbolize patriotism.

Originally, Modern Woodmen had a unique set of membership restrictions and criteria. Religiously, the group was quite open, accepting "Jew and Gentile, the Catholic and Protestant, the agnostic and the atheist." However, until the mid-1900s, membership was restricted to white males between the ages of 18–45 from the 12 "healthiest" states – Ohio, Indiana, Illinois, Michigan, Wisconsin, Minnesota, Iowa, Missouri, the Dakotas, Nebraska and Kansas. Residents of large cities were also disqualified from membership, as were those employed in certain professions, such as railway workers, underground miners, gunpowder factory employees, liquor wholesalers and manufacturers, saloon keepers, "aeronauts", sailors on the lakes and seas, and professional baseball players.

In 1884, the head office was organized in Fulton, Illinois. The first death claim of $698.58 was paid the same year.

Foresters drill teams 
One of the most unique elements of the organization was its drill teams, which came to be known as the Modern Woodmen Foresters. The first drill team was organized in Hutchinson, Kansas, in 1894. These groups became nationally known for events held from 1890 to the late 1930s, and the Foresters were even honored by Herbert Hoover at the White House.

Because each group was differentiated by a different style and color of uniform, their demonstrations were referred to as "Rainbow Parades." The Rainbow Parades were hosted by cities across the United States and included 10,000 units of Foresters, with more than 160,000 men participating. The last known Rainbow Parade was held on Michigan Boulevard in Chicago, and it halted traffic for more than two hours while thousands of spectators viewed the scene.

Modern Woodmen Sanatorium 

During the tuberculosis (TB) epidemic of the early 1900s, Modern Woodmen opened a 1,000-acre (4.0 km²) facility in Colorado Springs, Colorado, in 1907.

The facility cost $1.5 million to build and was named one of the most outstanding institutions for the treatment of TB by the American College of Surgeons. From 1909 to 1947, the sanatorium provided free treatment to more than 12,000 members. It offered board, lodging, treatment, medicine, dental work and laundering, all at no expense to the patient.

Tuberculosis was the leading cause of death among Modern Woodmen members when the society opened the Modern Woodmen Tuberculosis Sanatorium. Following World War II, antibiotics became available and TB declined in the United States. The facility closed in 1947, when TB ranked eighth in leading causes of death.

Home offices 
Modern Woodmen's first home office was organized in Fulton, Illinois, in 1884. When the organization moved to Rock Island, Illinois, in 1897, Fulton residents fought to keep Modern Woodmen in their town. The move was blocked three times before it was successful. In 1898, Modern Woodmen officially opened its home office at 1504 Third Ave.

In 1967, Modern Woodmen opened a new home office, located at 1701 First Avenue in Rock Island, Illinois, to accommodate its rapid growth. Its home office remains there today, where the organization maintains an active role in the Quad Cities community.

In 2008, Modern Woodmen became the naming rights sponsor of Modern Woodmen Park, home of the Quad Cities River Bandits, in Davenport, Iowa.

Fraternalism 
Modern Woodmen is a tax-exempt fraternal benefit society. The membership organization sells life insurance, annuity and investment products to help fund member benefits and social, educational and volunteer programs that meet community needs.

As a fraternal organization, the society is organized around a lodge system, called chapters, Summit chapters and youth service clubs. These groups offer fellowship and community service opportunities for members. In 2016, Modern Woodmen members were part of 2,466 chapters, 283 Summit chapters and 782 youth service clubs nationwide.

Modern Woodmen members across the United States participate in numerous activities to socialize, learn and volunteer in their communities. Members unite for volunteer efforts that provide money, donations, hand-on labor and other resources to improve lives in their communities. The organization's Matching Fund Program matches money raised by individual chapters for community members or local organizations in need.

Modern Woodmen's fraternal expenditures for member benefits and community programs totaled $21.7 million in 2016. These programs included fraternal aid, college scholarships, newborn benefits, orphan benefits, final wishes resources, member discounts and youth educational programs.

Products 

Modern Woodmen and its subsidiaries provide life insurance and annuity, investment and banking products to the family market. Life insurance in force totaled over $38.9 billion in 2016. Modern Woodmen has three wholly owned subsidiaries:
 MWA Financial Services, Inc., founded in 2001, functions as an introducing  broker dealer and distributes securities products.
 Modern Woodmen General Agency, founded in 2002, offers brokered insurance products, including health insurance, long-term care insurance, disability income insurance and more.

Financial standing
A. M. Best rates Modern Woodmen's financial stability, security and management performance as A (Excellent), the third highest of 15 ratings. The rating is based on a comprehensive quantitative evaluation of the organization's balance sheet strength, operating performance and business profile. Insurers in the superior category are considered to have a superior ability to meet their ongoing obligations.

Modern Woodmen follows a conservative investment approach, holding more than 80 percent of its portfolio in corporate and government bonds. As of 2016, Modern Woodmen holds $112.09 for every $100 in liabilities.

Notable members 
 Granville Pearl Aikman (1858–1923), State of Kansas District Judge and suffragist

References

External links 
 

Financial services companies established in 1883
Banks established in 1883
1883 establishments in the United States
Service organizations based in the United States
Banks based in Illinois
Organizations based in Illinois
Companies based in the Quad Cities
Rock Island, Illinois
Woodmen of the World
Organizations established in 1883
Secret societies in the United States